Frank Cardona (born June 18, 1971) is a Canadian former soccer player, and currently a head coach with Hamilton United Elite.

Playing career 
Cardona played at the college level with Centennial College, where he was named the Male Athlete of the Year twice in the 1990-1991, and 1991-1992 seasons and All Canadian OCAA Starting 11 In 1991. He began his professional career in 1991 with Toronto Blizzard in the Canadian Soccer League and American Professional Soccer League. In 1994, he signed with the Toronto Rockets of the American Professional Soccer League, and made his debut on July 15, 1994 in a match against Montreal Impact coming on as a substitute for Gino DiFlorio. In 1996, he signed with Toronto Supra in the Canadian National Soccer League. During the 1996 winter season he signed with Toronto Shooting Stars of the National Professional Soccer League.

After a sabbatical he returned to Toronto Supra to compete in the Canadian Professional Soccer League in 2004, and assisted in securing the Eastern Conference title.

Managerial career 
In 2009, he served in the Marketing and Public Relations department for Portugal FC in the Canadian Soccer League. In 2011, he was appointed the Director of Soccer Operations for SC Toronto Pro. He later became involved with Hamilton United Elite as a head coach for the U17/U21 girls team.

Honors 
Toronto Supra
 Canadian Professional Soccer League Eastern Conference (1): 2004

References 

Living people
Canadian soccer coaches 
Canadian soccer players
American Professional Soccer League players
Canadian Soccer League (1998–present) players
National Professional Soccer League (1984–2001) players
SC Toronto players
Toronto Blizzard (1986–1993) players
Toronto Rockets players
Toronto Shooting Stars players
Soccer people from Ontario
Canadian Soccer League (1987–1992) players
Canadian National Soccer League players
1969 births
Association football midfielders